Calibraska is an extended play (EP) by the American pop-rap duo Jack & Jack. Their debut EP was independently released via the Philip J. Kaplan digital music distributor DistroKid on July 24, 2015. The title is a portmanteau of the U.S. states Nebraska, where the duo originate, and California, where they are now based. Within hours of its release, Calibraska charted at number 1 on the U.S. iTunes albums chart ahead of DS2 by Future and 1989 by Taylor Swift.

Track list

Charts

Weekly charts

Year-end charts

References

2015 debut EPs
Self-released EPs
Jack & Jack albums